The LVI Edition of the Viña del Mar International Song Festival took place from February 22 to 27, 2015 at Anfiteatro de la Quinta Vergara, in the Chilean city of Viña del Mar.

Artists

Confirmed

Singers 
 Yusuf Islam
 Alejandro Fernández
 Reik
 Emmanuel
 Ricardo Arjona
 Luis Fonsi
 Yandel
 Cultura Profética
 Pedro Aznar
 Vicentico
 Romeo Santos
 Nicole
 Nano Stern
 Noche de Brujas
 Oscar D'León

Comedians
 Dinamita Show
 Huaso Filomeno
 Centella
 Arturo Ruiz-Tagle
 Leon Murillo

Broadcasting
NBC Universo Will Air Viña del Mar Festival in the U.S. NBC Universo will provide more than 34 hours of exclusive U.S. coverage that will include live streaming and concert specials via multiple platforms, including TV and mobile devices. In addition, the network will air a series of "best of" one-hour specials that will air Sundays at 8 p.m. for two full months, beginning March 1.

Controversy
Chilean media have argued the festival is run by male chauvinists since it only has 8 female acts out of 70.

Schedule

Day 1 (Sunday 22) 
 Luis Fonsi
 Dinamita Show
 Yandel

Day 2 (Monday 23) 
 Ricardo Arjona
 Centella 
 Reik

Day 3 (Tuesday 24) 
 Alejandro Fernández
 Huaso Filomeno
 Nicole
 Emmanuel

Day 4 (Wednesday 25) 
 Vicentico
 León Murillo
 Pedro Aznar
 Cultura Profética

Day 5 (Thursday 26) 
 Romeo Santos
 Noche de Brujas

Day 6 (Friday 27) 
 Yusuf Islam
 Arturo Ruiz-Tagle
 Nano Stern
 Oscar D'León

Competition

Judges 
 Pedro Aznar
 Nicole
 Nano Stern
 Ignacio Gutiérrez
 Isidora Urrejola
 Nayade Jara
 Alejandro Guarello
 Iván Núñez
 Maria Alejandra Requena
 Oscar D'León

Folkloric competition

Participants 
The finalists in the Folkloric Category at the Festival Viña del Mar 2015:

International competition

Participants
The finalists in the International Category at the Festival Viña del Mar 2015:

Queen 
 Jhendelyn Núñez, known to participate in Vedette shows--> WON

Applicants 
 Jhendelyn Núñez, known to participate in Vedette shows--> WON
 Flavia Fucenecco, participated in reality show.-->4th place
 Katherine Salosny, actress and recognized TV and radio show host.-->2nd place.
 Daniella Chávez, Playboy bunny.-->3rd place.

References

Viña del Mar International Song Festival by year
Vina Del Mar International Song Festival, 2015
2015 in music
2015 festivals in Chile
2015 music festivals
February 2015 events in South America